The Russian State University for the Humanities (RSUH, RGGU), is a university in Moscow, Russia with over 25,000 students. It was created in 1991 as the result of the merger of the Moscow Urban University of the People (est. 1908) and the Moscow State University for History and Archives (est. 1930). It is one of the leading universities for humanities in the Russian Federation.

History
The Moscow Urban University of the People was founded in 1908 on the initiative of the Russian patron of the arts, and played a role in Russian higher education from its inception. It was the center of enlightened and moral education right up to 1918, realizing the progressive principles of alternative education in conjunction with a sound educational foundation available to all.

The Moscow State Institute for History and Archives, founded in 1930 as a center for the preparation of archivists, became over the years a focus of scientific research. In its archival pursuits in areas of history and such auxiliary realms as the study of primary sources, archaeology and palaeography, it managed to preserve the best of Russian research. By the beginning of the 1990s, this institution had achieved university level which enabled it to become the organizational heart of the RSUH, founded in 1991.

The university, which since then became one of the leading universities in the country for humanities (especially linguistics, arts and history) has established a strong connection to international scientific community and has many ties with universities abroad, including Université Laval, Trinity College, Helwan University, Cairo University, University of Freiburg and University of Vienna.

Alexander Borisovich Bezborodov, Rector of the university, was suspended by the European University Association (EUA) following support for the Russian invasion of Ukraine by the Russian Union of Rectors (RUR) in March 2022, for being "diametrically opposed to the European values that they committed to when joining EUA”.

University structure
RSUH currently comprises eleven institutes, eighteen faculties, eight laboratories, and fifty departments. There are five university-wide faculties:
Faculty of Philosophy
Faculty of History of Art 
Faculty of Sociology
Faculty of Cultural Studies
Faculty of PR and Advertising

The eleven institutes are:

Historical and Archival Institute
This is the biggest institute in the university, consisting of Faculty of Archiving,  Faculty of Documentation And Technotronic Archives, Faculty of History, Political Science, and Law and Faculty of International Relations and Foreign Regional Studies.
Institute of Economics, Management and Law
Including of Faculty of Economics, Faculty of Management and Faculty of Law
L. S. Vygotsky Institute of Psychology
Including Faculty of Psychology and Faculty of Psychology of the Education
Institute of Mass Media and Advertising
Including Faculty of Journalism
Institute of Linguistics (Russian Wikipedia)
Including of Faculty of Theory and Practice Of Linguistics
Institute of Information Sciences and Security Technologies
Including Faculty of Information Systems and Security
Institute of History and Philology
Including Faculty of History and Philology
Institute for Oriental and Classical Studies (Russian Wikipedia)
International Institute of the New Educational Technologies
Institute of Additional Education
Institute of Regional Post-Soviet Research

All across the university and all its institutes and faculties, there are more than 50 scientific centres, including international ones in cooperation with French, German and Canadian researchers.

Its curriculum extends from preparatory to post-doctoral studies. Nowadays, the university is most renowned for its linguistics, history, and history of arts programs, as well as for intelligent systems (AI), cliometrics and cliodynamics research groups.

The university also serves as the main centre for the Moscow School of Comparative Linguistics.

Campus
The main campus of the university is located near the Novoslobodskaya Metro Station in the North-Western part of Moscow. It is a closed campus  consisting of 7 corpuses, 6 being used for the educational purposes and one (Corpus 4)  used as a dormitory for the international students. The main corpus is the corpus 6, which, among other things, consists of the main University library and the University Museum. The university scientific library has a wide physical, as well as digital collection, providing scientific works and fiction. The libraries reading room, also located in the main corpus, consists of 3 big halls (2 of which have a second tier). Corpus 6 is connected to the corpus 7, which was the first building in the main campus to enter the new university in 1991. Corpus 7 used to serve as Moscow Urban University Of the People (in the name of A. Shanyavskiy).

There are 2 other smaller separate campuses in the different parts of the city, one serving as a home for Institute of Information Sciences and Security Technologies, and the other one as a home for Historical and Archival Institute. The latter is located in Kitay-gorod right in the city center. It used to be a main campus for Moscow State University of History And Archives, which later became a base for newly established Russian State University for the Humanities. The institute occupies a network of historic buildings along the Nikolskaya Street, including the former Moscow Print Yard and the cells of the Zaikonospassky Monastery.

See also
Education in Russia

References

External links
  Official university website
  Official university website